Lynn Gamwell (born 1943) is an American nonfiction author and art curator known for her books on art history, the history of mathematics, the history of science, and their connections.

Gamwell has a bachelor's degree from the University of Illinois at Chicago, an MFA from Claremont Graduate School, and a PhD from the University of California, Los Angeles. She is also a faculty member at the School of Visual Arts, and has curated exhibits for institutions including the Freud Museum, New York Academy of Sciences, and Loyola University Museum of Art.

Her books include:
Sigmund Freud and Art: His Personal Collection of Antiquities (catalog for exhibit The Sigmund Freud Antiquities: Fragments from a Buried Past, Sigmund Freud Museum, 1989)
Madness in America: Cultural and Medical Perceptions of Mental Illness before 1914 (with Nancy Tomes, Cornell Studies in the History of Psychiatry, Cornell University Press, 1994).
Dreams 1900-2000: Science, Art, and the Unconscious Mind (catalog for exhibit, Cornell University Press, 2000)
Mathematics and Art: A Cultural History (Princeton University Press, 2016)
Exploring the Invisible: Art, Science, and the Spiritual, revised and expanded edition (Princeton University Press, 2020)

References

1943 births
Living people
American art historians
Women art historians
University of Illinois Chicago alumni
Claremont McKenna College alumni
University of California, Los Angeles alumni
School of Visual Arts faculty
Historians from California